The Weskeag River is a short tidal river in Knox County, Maine. The Abenaki Indians called it Wessaweskeag, meaning "tidal creek" or "salt creek". Its mouth is on the border between the towns of South Thomaston and Owls Head.

See also
List of rivers of Maine

References

Maine Streamflow Data from the USGS
Maine Watershed Data From Environmental Protection Agency

Rivers of Knox County, Maine
Rivers of Maine